Žarko Korać ( Cyrillic: Жapкo Kopaћ, born 11 June 1987) is a Montenegrin football player who plays as a forward.

Club career
Žarko has played mainly with Montenegrin club FK Zeta, having achieved the title of Montenegrin First League top scorer in the season 2006–07.

After this early success, he decided to move abroad signing a contract with Serbian SuperLiga club FK Vojvodina. After not getting many chances there, he returned to FK Zeta in December 2008. He played there until January 2010 when he moved to Moldovan club FC Sheriff Tiraspol.
In summer 2010 he returned to Zeta where he became a regular at the starting 11.

He finished the 2012–13 Montenegrin First League season as the co-top scorer with 15 goals.
following this success he  has been loaned to Hapoel Haifa of the Israeli Premier League, where he scored 11 goals, finishing as the 5th top scorer in the league.

on June 2, 2014, Korać has signed a 4-years contract with Israeli club Beitar Jerusalem, with a salary of €160,000 per season. Beitar also paid €160,000 to Hapoel Haifa for his service. After just half a season in Beitar, Žarko returned to Hapoel Haifa, where he plays ever since.

Honours

Club
 FK Zeta
 Montenegrin First League: 2006–07

Individual
Montenegrin First League top goalscorer: 2006–07, 2012–13

References

https://us.soccerway.com/players/zarko-korac/47188/

1987 births
Living people
People from Podgorica Municipality
Association football forwards
Montenegrin footballers
Montenegro under-21 international footballers
FK Zeta players
FK Vojvodina players
FC Sheriff Tiraspol players
Hapoel Haifa F.C. players
Beitar Jerusalem F.C. players
OFK Grbalj players
Kuantan FA players
Zarko Korac
UiTM FC players
Hapoel Afula F.C. players
FK Jedinstvo Bijelo Polje players
Montenegrin First League players
Serbian SuperLiga players
Moldovan Super Liga players
Israeli Premier League players
Malaysia Premier League players
Zarko Korac
Liga Leumit players
Montenegrin expatriate footballers
Expatriate footballers in Serbia
Montenegrin expatriate sportspeople in Serbia
Expatriate footballers in Moldova
Montenegrin expatriate sportspeople in Moldova
Expatriate footballers in Israel
Montenegrin expatriate sportspeople in Israel
Expatriate footballers in Malaysia
Montenegrin expatriate sportspeople in Malaysia
Expatriate footballers in Thailand
Montenegrin expatriate sportspeople in Thailand
Montenegrin Second League players